Hui pan-nationalism refers to the common identity among diverse communities of Chinese-speaking Muslims (typically members of the Hui ethnic-cultural group). Hui pan-nationalism should be distinguished from nationalist sentiments by minority groups who are also Muslim such as those of the Uyghurs. These sentiments are grounded upon the Hui "zealously preserving and protecting their identity as enclaves ensconced in the dominant Han society." In exchange for support during the Cultural Revolution, the Hui were granted high political participation. Hui pan-nationalism was one of the first sources of modern Chinese nationalism, influenced by Western, Japanese and Soviet influences.

Some of the various Chinese Muslim groups included under the Hui are the Hui, Dungans, and Panthays. Because the Uyghurs are not of Sinitic origin, but rather Turkic, they are not included.

History 
Throughout history, the Hui have endured significant difficulties in maintaining pan-nationalistic identity. This includes maintaining the territorial boundary of their group, whilst attempting to integrate into larger society. This has posed significant challenges to the survival of the Hui, resulting in a need for Hui pan-nationalism. Some Muslims however, instead have assimilated their Hui identity into the traditional Han as a response to this challenge. This forced integration has led to Muslim-led rebellions (which were later suppressed), along with the complete alienation of the Hui identity.

Tang Dynasty 
Muslims arrived into China in the late 7th century as merchants. As an emerging, nascent identity in China, spreading Islam and the implementation of Shari’a law, and thus Hui pan-nationalism was of low priority. Instead, the early settlers mode of existence was founded upon secularity, naturalisation and assimilation. This identification of the Hui as ‘foreign merchants’ remained pervasive until the fall of the Song dynasty and establishment of the Yaun dynasty. The state remained responsible for managing the naturalisation of new populations into society.

Yuan Dynasty 
The fall of the Song dynasty ended fanfang (蕃坊) settlements of Muslims and Muslims were moved from commercial city enclaves to dispersed communities across China. Though fanfang settlements consolidated Hui identity, there was no real autonomy.

Ming Dynasty 
The fall of the Yuan dynasty and subsequent dissolution of the Mongol racial class system, was met with state-sanction program of Sinicization (cultural integration). This in culmination with the state imposing a monopoly on trade during agrarian distress, resulted in some Hui physically rebelling against government forces in the late Ming and Early Qing period. This was one of the first overt, physical manifestations of Hui pan-nationalism.

Qing Dynasty 
The Qing dynasty was marked by collective violence and anti-Hui political, social and literary discourse, known as Hui-phobia.

Nationalism became introduced into Chinese politics as a system of defence and regeneration in response to emerging western imperialism and the weakening of the Qing Dynasty. However, tensions rose between group rights and the need for national unity. These late-Qing revolutionists led by Sun Yat-Sen aspired to establish a Chinese state based on a single minzu model, the minzu being predominately Han. In response, the book the Muslim Awakening, written by Chinese students, published in 1908, was an early literary attempt of pan-nationalism; forming a group identity and rejecting the single minzu formation.

The defeat of China in the First Opium War and the First Sino-Japanese war was a major catalyst to fuelling Chinese nationalism.

During this time, theorist Liang Qichao developed two Chinese terms to describe these emerging themes of nationalism; minzuzhuyi, big or state nationalism and xiao minzuzhuyi, small or ethnic nationalism. Big nationalism encouraged the Hui to consider the positions as Chinese citizens; which takes precedence over their ethnic identities. Their ‘small’ nationalism however, conversely awards them a limited amount of freedom to identify as ethnically different from the Han majority.

The Dungan Revolt 
The Dungan Revolt by the Hui in the 1860s and 1870s was a “bloodbath."  This rebellion was led by Ma Hualong, and cut off the Qing state from the northwest of China.

Panthay Rebellion 
The Panthay rebellion was a Hui rebellion against the Manchu rulers of the Qing dynasty in southwestern Yunnan Province.

After the failure of many rebellions, many Hui fled to Kyrgyzstan and Kazakhstan, in Soviet Central Asia.

The Republic of China 

The establishment of the Republic of China in 1912 promoted the idea of nationality unity among all ethnic groups in China. President Sun Yat-Sen called for the “unification of China” and emphasised the equality among ethnic groups. This led to the establishment of the ‘Five Races under One Union’ or Five Official Nationalities, which encompassed the Hui's among other ethnic groups. This initially encompassed all Chinese Muslims and ethnic Hui (Turks) in the Xinjiang province. This document stated that China was composite of different yet politically equal groups. This state recognition of the Hui was a success to the efforts of Hui pan-nationalism. However, whilst Sun's recognition of the five Chinese nationalities, his ultimate goal was assimilationist; "Foreign observers say that Chinese are a sheet of loose sand. Why is this? It’s because the people as a whole care about the doctrines of the family and clan but not the state-nation. For Chinese, the unifying force of family and clan is very great indeed and many have been willing to sacrifice their families and lives to defend the clan. But there has never been a case of such a supreme sacrifice for the sake of the country. So the unifying force of the Chinese extends only to the clan, not as far as to the nation-state.”By involving the collective population, the Nationalists thought they could prevent the total dismemberment of the Chinese state.

Within the national government, Chiang Kai-shek nationalist party were vehement in their denial of other Chinese nationalities; arguing that groups such as the Hui were merely a subvariety of the same minzu. The communists, which later established the People's Republic of China, would later regard Hui as a distinct nationality rather than a religious sub-division.

However, following the successive victories in the First Sino-Japanese War and the Russo-Japanese War, Japan planned psychological warfare to mobilise the people of Huijiao (Hui religion), which continued until the end of World War II. The Japanese capitalised on Hui pan-nationalism ideals to project their agenda on the Hui populace. This mobilisation by the Japanese aided in fostering declining attitudes of nationalism, as many Hui were satisfied with the state's recognition of the Hui in the ‘Five Official Nationalities.’

By the 1920s in China, propaganda efforts such as the founding of the magazine Huiguang 回光 (Light of Islam) within the Society of Light (International Moslem Association) were common. In an article entitled “Political Situation of China and Muslims” (1925), the author, Teijirō Sakuma, called on Muslims in China to strive for independence. Sakuma reasons that the Hui was a zu (“race” or “nationality”) with state recognition, that should be able to claim political rights and resort to political actions when necessary. According to Sakuma, Huizu (“Hui nationality”) was built on a religious basis and this independent nationhood of Huizu was consistent with ideals of Pan-Islamism.

In 1933, the separatist state, the First East Turkestan Republic was established by the Uyghur nationality in the western Xinjiang province. In 1934, the Guomindang government, the Chinese National Party led by Chiang Kai-shek, allied with the Hui warlord Ma Zhongying to overthrow the separatist state. The Hui cooperation with the Han government in defending the territorial integrity of the Chinese nation shows how the Hui successfully consolidated their own ethnic ‘Hui’ identity, whilst working with the Han in defence of their common Chinese national identity.

The Association of Research on the National Question in the North West Bureau of the Central Committee of the Chinese Communist Party edited a comprehensive document investigating the Hui minority, published in 1941. It strongly criticised the Japanese narrative which promoted the ‘self determination of Hui’ to establish a Hui nation-state through secession. The CCP also recognised that the Hui people were oppressed by international imperialism represented by the Japanese invasion and the domestic ‘national oppression’ the Han.

The People's Republic of China 
The nationality policy of the People's Republic of China was formulated in the 1930s. This was in order to enlist support against the Chiang Kai-shek nationality policy which de-emphasised ethnic differences in favour of unity of all peoples as member of the Chinese race. This was encapsulated during the Long March, as communist leaders were faced with extermination unless promised affordances were granted to the minorities. As a show of good will, first Hui autonomous county was set up in the 1930s in Tongxin, southern Ningxia. Mao Zedong issued appeals to the northwest Hui to support the Communists' cause, one slogan of the Communist 15th Army Corps was: "Build our own antiJapanese Mohammedan Red Army." Later party documents revealed that Chairman Mao promised self-determination to minorities until 1937. Despite having the right to secede, this was withdrawn in 1940, a much more limited sense of autonomy.

Confucianism, an influential Chinese philosophy promoted assimilation and acculturation of minority people in Han society. The PRC used this as the basis for the Ronghe policy. The Chinese Communist Party (CCP) subsequently argued that minorities would only be able to achieve socialist transformation and modernity by establishing a social system under the CCP. A minor approach was first taken, exemplified in 1957 by the PRC Premier, Zhou Enlai, who stated that "assimilation would not be welcome if achieved by force." However, this was later replaced by political extremism and forced assimilation imposed by the Cultural Revolution. Despite governance shift in 1978, ronghe ideology lives on.

The question if the Hui are a nationality (minzu) was the basis of several Communist Party documents dating from the 1940s, published for the first time publicly in 1980 as Huihui minzu wenti (The question of the Hui hui nationality). 

Following Mao's death in 1976, the Hui and Han have reached a mutual tolerance, with the CCP attempting to rectify Mao's intolerant policies on religion that he exhibited during the cultural revolution and instead focus on acceptance and reformation, achieved by restoring the moderate approach to ethnic policies it had taken pre-1957.

As a result, the Hui are allowed to practice Shari’a law to a limited extent across China and are responsible for Ningixa Hui Autonomous Region. Legislatively, political rights are enshrined. In Article 4 of the PRC Constitution of 1982, it declares that all nationalities have the right to preserve or change their own ways and customs and develop their own languages. Religious freedom of minorities is also protected by the Chinese State under Article 36 of the PRC Constitution.

Compared to the status of other Muslim groups, these successes are attributed to the Hui's “skill of negotiating around the grey areas of China’s political system and the pan-nationalist movement." This is prevalent in the autonomous region, Xinjiang assigned to the Hui governance, along with 2 autonomous prefectures, 9 autonomous counties and a number of autonomous townships.

Despite legal assurances, Muslim minority groups are facing an increasing 'crackdown' on their religious practices under the guise of the Global War on Terror, whereby their international connections and links to Islam are seen as a threat to Chinese nationalism, as is evident in the CCP's actions in Xinjiang in regards to the East Turkestan independence movement. This is in response to a number of terrorist incidents carried out by local Uyghur jihadists with links to ETIM. ETIM is declared a terrorist organization by UN.

Historian Jin Jitang 金吉堂, argues that Huijiao minzu 回教民族 (“Huireligion nationality”) or Huimin/zu (“Hui people/nationality”) is a Sinophone Muslim ethnicity. This argument for a seperae Sinophone Muslim identity became popular among the Hui elites in the later years of the Republic. Communist theorists used his argument to justify their early treatment of the Hui as an ethnic minority or ‘minority nationality’, resulting on the Chinese Communist Party identifying Chinese Muslims as a historically oppressed minzu rather than a religious group.

Shadian Incident 
The Shadian Incident in Yunnan in 1975, left over 1600 Hui dead.

1989 Salman Rushdie Protest 
In 1989, a student led Hui protest, protested the publication of Salman Rushdie's book, ‘Sexual Customs’ (Xingfengsu), described as a resurgence in Hui Muslim ethnic nationalism. Protestors claimed that the books contents “denigrated Islam.” Over 3000 Muslims in Beijing attended, with over 20,000 in Lanzhou, 100,000 in Xining and smaller protests in Ürümqi, Shanghai, Inner Mongolia, Wuhan and Yunnan during April and May. In response, the state met the demands of the protestors, banning the book entirely. Reportedly, 13 million copies were confiscated. 95,240 copies were burnt publicly in Lanzhou, the Shanghai editors were fired with the publication houses shortly closed for “reorganisation”, merely emphasising the power and achievements of the Hui pan-nationalistic movement, especially as the Tiananmen Square Massacre occurred concurrently.

1989 President of Iran Visit 
This visit sparked a "fourth tide" in Muslim identity in China. This is due to the subsequent state sponsored tourism and private Islamic investment opportunities that were encouraged following this visit.

Significant Contributors

Ya’wub Wang Jingzhai 
Ya’wub Wang Jingzhai (1879-1949) was an early theorist and religious scholar, also known as one of the “Four Great Akhonds”. Wang Jingzhai promoted the compatibility of pan-Islamic identity with Hui nationalism, and Hui nationalism with Chinese nationalism. These concepts stimulated traction among the Hui community, but were also threatened by increasing Japanese mobilisation of the Hui, and later invasion during WWII.

One of his articles published in the widely read Chinese Muslim article Yuehua 月華 interpreted the hadith, “the love of one’s homeland [springs forth] from the faith," specific to homeland, and therefore, the Hui should defend and build their homeland (China). This among with other direct scriptural justifications for nationalism were disseminated for Chinese Muslim audiences.

Xue Wenbo 
Xue Wenbo 薛 文波 (1909-1984), using a Leninist framework, constructed a “unified consciousness of the Pan-Islamic nation." He argued that the ‘Huizu’ are the oppressed proletarians of the world, with most wishing to unite under the banner of Islam. (Huijiao).

Ma Jian 
In 1950, Ma Jian published an article in 'The People's Daily.' His article criticised imperialism in his justification for religious freedom in China.

Ma Shouqian 
The nationalist fervor that embodied Hui intellectuals in the first half of the century, Ma Shouqian has recently termed "the New Awakening of the Hui at the end of f9th and beginning of the 20th centuries."

Islamic Discourse 
Many religious Chinese imams and students were influenced by various anti-imperialist Islamic texts from authors such as Muhammad ‘Abduh (1849-1905) and Muhib al-Din al-Khatib (1886-1969) which reinforced their national Chinese identity with religious justification. Many of these nationalists were educated under the Qadim (قديم Old) jiaopai 教派 or “teaching school” of Islam, which drew upon imperial Han kitab political theory that the source of power and legitimacy of a political entity comes from a personal sovereign who embodies the Mandate of Heaven. However, the translation of works was highly selective, with ideals normally in line with Chinese nationalism and of benefit in the face of imperialist aggression and indigenous modernism.

Present Day 
Maintaining the identity of the Hui was critical during the nascent state of the People's Republic of China. Scholars such as Claude Lefort, attribute the fundamental nature of authoritarianism and totalitarianism, is to concentrate nationality in order to maintain power, and have a united enemy against the interference of foreign powers. Thus, citizenship was imposed rather than sought onto minorities. The ultimate policy that governs the Hui's promotes both assimilation and autonomy, an “irony that continues to plague China’s nationality policy.” Yet, much of the Hui identity is blurred due to the mixture of their own unique, cultural practices, coupled with their almost complete assimilation into Han society. Some scholars believe that the Hui will eventually revolt, and attempt to violently secede from the Chinese state, whilst others believe they are too assimilated to dominant Han culture, known as Sinicization.

In recent years, there have been sporadic clashes between Hui and Han. In 2004, scores were reportedly killed during ethnic bloodletting in Henan Province, and in 2012, dozens of people were injured by the police during protests over the demolition of a mosque in Ningxia that the government had declared illegal.

State Sponsored Activities 
The Islamic Association of China, the Nationalities Institute, and the State Nationalities Commission are bodies which aid in increasing the governance of the Hui, attributed to the efforts of Hui pan-nationalism. Whilst the Islamic Association of China is a notable attempt to unify Chinese Muslims, it in recent years has been overwhelmed in perpetuating sectarian divisions among Chinese Muslims. The association has been accused of abetting state ideologies, by the propagation of patriotism and emphasis on Hui-centrism.

Hui people can also subscribe to the state-sponsored periodicals; China's Muslims (Zhongguo Musilin) and Muslim World (Musilin shijie), which help to promote maintaining Hui identity and unity across China.

The state has also been extremely involved in the reconstruction of historic mosques and other religious sites, to encourage tourism and pilgrimage for all Muslims. This aids in increasing participation amongst the Hui in their religious expression.

Result 
Overall, these 'goodnatured' acts have allowed China to maintain close political and economic ties with Muslim countries. This can be manifested through trade, contracts, etc.

Scholarly Representation 
The representation of Hui pan-nationalism is largely absent from academic discourse, and more broadly, the same of Hui people as an identity.

See also
Chinese nationalism
Dunganistan
Islam in China
Islamism
Nationalism
Sinocentrism

References

Hui people
Islam in China
Chinese nationalism
Indigenous nationalism